The 2009–10 San Antonio Spurs season was the 43rd season of the franchise, 37th in San Antonio, and 34th in the National Basketball Association (NBA).

In the playoffs, the Spurs defeated the Dallas Mavericks in six games in the First Round, before being swept by the Phoenix Suns in four games in the Semifinals.

Key dates
June 25 – The 2009 NBA draft took place in New York City.
July 8 – The free agency period started.

Summary

NBA Draft 2009

Free agency

Draft picks

Roster

Pre-season

Regular season

Standings

Record vs. opponents

Game log

|- bgcolor="#bbffbb"
| 1
| October 28
| New Orleans
| 
| Tony Parker (17)
| DeJuan Blair (11)
| Tony Parker (7)
| AT&T Center18,581
| 1–0
|- bgcolor="#ffcccc"
| 2
| October 30
| @ Chicago
| 
| Tim Duncan (28)
| Tim Duncan (16)
| Manu Ginóbili (4)
| United Center21,412
| 1–1
|- bgcolor="#bbffbb"
| 3
| October 31
| Sacramento
| 
| Tony Parker (24)
| DeJuan Blair, Tim Duncan (10)
| Tony Parker (7)
| AT&T Center16,966
| 2–1

|- bgcolor="#ffcccc"
| 4
| November 5
| @ Utah
| 
| Tony Parker (21)
| Tim Duncan (13)
| Richard Jefferson, Tony Parker (3)
| EnergySolutions Arena19,797
| 2–2
|- bgcolor="#ffcccc"
| 5
| November 6
| @ Portland
| 
| Richard Jefferson (19)
| Tim Duncan (8)
| Manu Ginóbili, Roger Mason (4)
| Rose Garden20,498
| 2–3
|- bgcolor="#bbffbb"
| 6
| November 9
| Toronto
| 
| Manu Ginóbili (36)
| Antonio McDyess (10)
| Richard Jefferson (7)
| AT&T Center17,714
| 3–3
|- bgcolor="#bbffbb"
| 7
| November 11
| Dallas
| 
| Richard Jefferson (29)
| Matt Bonner, Antonio McDyess (9)
| Manu Ginóbili (6)
| AT&T Center18,581
| 4–3
|- bgcolor="#ffcccc"
| 8
| November 14
| Oklahoma City
| 
| Tim Duncan (22)
| Tim Duncan (10)
| Manu Ginóbili (6)
| AT&T Center17,947
| 4–4
|- bgcolor="#ffcccc"
| 9
| November 18
| @ Dallas
|  (OT)
| Tim Duncan (22)
| Tim Duncan (14)
| Tim Duncan (6)
| American Airlines Center20,110
| 4–5
|- bgcolor="#ffcccc"
| 10
| November 19
| Utah
| 
| Tim Duncan (21)
| Tim Duncan (9)
| Tim Duncan (5)
| AT&T Center17,519
| 4–6
|- bgcolor="#bbffbb"
| 11
| November 21
| Washington
| 
| Tony Parker (17)
| Theo Ratliff (11)
| Tony Parker (8)
| AT&T Center16,888
| 5–6
|- bgcolor="#bbffbb"
| 12
| November 23
| Milwaukee
| 
| Tim Duncan (24)
| Tim Duncan (12)
| Tony Parker (6)
| AT&T Center17,677
| 6–6
|- bgcolor="#bbffbb"
| 13
| November 25
| Golden State
| 
| Tony Parker (32)
| Tim Duncan (10)
| Tony Parker (7)
| AT&T Center17,606
| 7–6
|- bgcolor="#bbffbb"
| 14
| November 27
| @ Houston
| 
| Tim Duncan (21)
| Antonio McDyess (14)
| Tony Parker (7)
| Toyota Center18,164
| 8–6
|- bgcolor="#bbffbb"
| 15
| November 29
| Philadelphia
| 
| Tim Duncan (22)
| DeJuan Blair (10)
| Tony Parker (8)
| AT&T Center17,161
| 9–6

|- bgcolor="#ffcccc"
| 16
| December 3
| Boston
| 
| DeJuan Blair (18)
| Tim Duncan (15)
| Tony Parker (7)
| AT&T Center18,581
| 9–7
|- bgcolor="#ffcccc"
| 17
| December 5
| Denver
| 
| Tony Parker (27)
| Matt Bonner (7)
| Tony Parker (5)
| AT&T Center17,592
| 9–8
|- bgcolor="#ffcccc"
| 18
| December 7
| @ Utah
| 
| Matt Bonner (28)
| Tim Duncan (11)
| Tony Parker (5)
| EnergySolutions Arena17,565
| 9–9
|- bgcolor="#bbffbb"
| 19
| December 9
| Sacramento
| 
| Richard Jefferson (23)
| Antonio McDyess (9)
| Tony Parker (11)
| AT&T Center17,353
| 10–9
|- bgcolor="#bbffbb"
| 20
| December 11
| Charlotte
| 
| Manu Ginóbili (22)
| Tim Duncan (9)
| Tony Parker (10)
| AT&T Center17,508
| 11–9
|- bgcolor="#bbffbb"
| 21
| December 13
| @ L.A Clippers
| 
| Tim Duncan (21)
| DeJuan Blair (9)
| Tony Parker (7)
| Staples Center16,464
| 12–9
|- bgcolor="#ffcccc"
| 22
| December 15
| @ Phoenix
| 
| Tim Duncan (34)
| Tim Duncan (14)
| Manu Ginóbili (6)
| US Airways Center17,964
| 12–10
|- bgcolor="#bbffbb"
| 23
| December 16
| @ Golden State
| 
| Tim Duncan (27)
| Tim Duncan (15)
| Manu Ginóbili (5)
| Oracle Arena17,857
| 13–10
|- bgcolor="#bbffbb"
| 24
| December 19
| Indiana
| 
| Tim Duncan (19)
| Tim Duncan (16)
| Tony Parker (4)
| AT&T Center17,075
| 14–10
|- bgcolor="#bbffbb"
| 25
| December 21
| L.A Clippers
| 
| Tony Parker (19)
| Theo Ratliff (7)
| Roger Mason, Jr. (5)
| AT&T Center17,451
| 15-10
|- bgcolor="#ffcccc"
| 26
| December 23
| Portland
| 
| Tim Duncan (24)
| Tim Duncan (11)
| Tony Parker, Manu Ginóbili, George Hill, Roger Mason, Jr. (4)
| AT&T Center18,581
| 15–11
|- bgcolor="#bbffbb"
| 27
| December 26
| @ Milwaukee
| 
| Tim Duncan (26)
| DeJuan Blair (12)
| Tony Parker, Manu Ginóbili (8)
| Bradley Center14,864
| 16–11
|- bgcolor="#bbffbb"
| 28
| December 27
| @ New York
| 
| Tony Parker (22)
| DeJuan Blair (10)
| Richard Jefferson (4)
| Madison Square Garden19,763
| 17–11
|- bgcolor="#bbffbb"
| 29
| December 29
| Minnesota
| 
| Richard Jefferson (24)
| Tim Duncan (10)
| Manu Ginóbili (10)
| AT&T Center18,581
| 18–11
|- bgcolor="#bbffbb"
| 30
| December 31
| Miami
| 
| Tim Duncan (23)
| Tim Duncan (10)
| Tony Parker (9)
| AT&T Center18,581
| 19–11

|- bgcolor="#bbffbb"
| 31
| January 2
| @ Washington
| 
| Tim Duncan (23)
| Tim Duncan (7)
| Tony Parker (7)
| Verizon Center19,025
| 20–11
|- bgcolor="#ffcccc"
| 32
| January 3
| @ Toronto
| 
| Tony Parker (23)
| Tim Duncan (12)
| Tony Parker (6)
| Air Canada Centre18,323
| 20–12
|- bgcolor="#bbffbb"
| 33
| January 6
| Detroit
| 
| Tony Parker (23)
| DeJuan Blair (8)
| Tony Parker (6)
| AT&T Center17,337
| 21–12
|- bgcolor="#ffcccc"
| 34
| January 8
| Dallas
| 
| Tim Duncan (31)
| Tim Duncan (12)
| Manu Ginóbili (7)
| AT&T Center18,581
| 21–13
|- bgcolor="#bbffbb"
| 35
| January 10
| New Jersey
| 
| Manu Ginóbili (21)
| Tim Duncan (17)
| Tony Parker (5)
| AT&T Center18,047
| 22–13
|- bgcolor="#bbffbb"
| 36
| January 12
| L.A Lakers
| 
| Tim Duncan (25)
| Tim Duncan (13)
| Tony Parker, Manu Ginóbili (6)
| AT&T Center18,581
| 23–13
|- bgcolor="#bbffbb"
| 37
| January 13
| @ Oklahoma City
|  (OT)
| Tony Parker, DeJuan Blair (28)
| DeJuan Blair (21)
| Tony Parker (8)
| Ford Center17,886
| 24–13
|- bgcolor="#ffcccc"
| 38
| January 15
| @ Charlotte
| 
| Tony Parker, DeJuan Blair, George Hill, Manu Ginóbili  (11)
| DeJuan Blair (16)
| Tim Duncan (5)
| Time Warner Cable Arena15,742
| 24–14
|- bgcolor="#ffcccc"
| 39
| January 16
| @ Memphis
| 
| Tim Duncan  (23)
| DeJuan Blair, Tim Duncan (8)
| Manu Ginóbili (7)
| FedExForum14,116
| 24–15
|- bgcolor="#bbffbb"
| 40
| January 18
| @ New Orleans
| 
| Tony Parker (25)
| Tim Duncan (14)
| Manu Ginóbili (6)
| New Orleans Arena16,549
| 25–15
|- bgcolor="#ffcccc"
| 41
| January 20
| Utah
| 
| Manu Ginóbili  (22)
| DeJuan Blair (11)
| Manu Ginóbili (8)
| AT&T Center17,584
| 25–16
|- bgcolor="#ffcccc"
| 42
| January 22
| Houston
| 
| Tim Duncan  (25)
| Tim Duncan (14)
| Tony Parker (10)
| AT&T Center18,581
| 25–17
|- bgcolor="#ffcccc"
| 43
| January 25
| Chicago
| 
| Tony Parker (20)
| DeJuan Blair (11)
| Tony Parker (8)
| AT&T Center18,581
| 25–18
|- bgcolor="#bbffbb"
| 44
| January 27
| Atlanta
| 
| Tim Duncan (21)
| Tim Duncan (27)
| Tony Parker (8)
| AT&T Center18,258
| 26–18
|- bgcolor="#bbffbb"
| 45
| January 29
| Memphis
| 
| Tim Duncan (19)
| DeJuan Blair (10)
| Tim Duncan, Manu Ginóbili (7)
| AT&T Center18,088
| 27–18
|- bgcolor="#ffcccc"
| 46
| January 31
| Denver
| 
| George Hill (17)
| Tim Duncan (10)
| Manu Ginóbili (9)
| AT&T Center17,607
| 27–19

|- bgcolor="#bbffbb"
| 47
| February 3
| @ Sacramento
| 
| George Hill (23)
| Tim Duncan (13)
| George Hill (9)
| ARCO Arena12,934
| 28–19
|- bgcolor="#ffcccc"
| 48
| February 4
| @ Portland
| 
| Manu Ginóbili (21)
| Tim Duncan (12)
| Tony Parker (6)
| Rose Garden20,572
| 28–20
|- bgcolor="#bbffbb"
| 49
| February 6
| @ L.A Clippers
| 
| George Hill (22)
| Antonio McDyess (10)
| Tony Parker (14)
| Staples Center18,258
| 29–20
|- bgcolor="#ffcccc"
| 50
| February 8
| @ L.A Lakers
| 
| Manu Ginóbili (21)
| Tim Duncan (15)
| Tony Parker (8)
| Staples Center18,997
| 29–21
|- bgcolor="#bbffbb"
| 51
| February 11
| @ Denver
| 
| George Hill, DeJuan Blair (17)
| DeJuan Blair (9)
| Manu Ginóbili (6)
| Pepsi Center18,611
| 30–21
|- align="center"
|colspan="9" bgcolor="#bbcaff"|All-Star Break
|- bgcolor="#bbffbb"
| 52
| February 17
| @ Indiana
| 
| Tony Parker (28)
| Tim Duncan (26)
| Manu Ginóbili (7)
| Conseco Fieldhouse14,947
| 31–21
|- bgcolor="#ffcccc"
| 53
| February 19
| @ Philadelphia
| 
| Manu Ginóbili (24)
| Tim Duncan (9)
| George Hill, Tony Parker (5)
| Wachovia Center16,376
| 31–22
|- bgcolor="#ffcccc"
| 54
| February 21
| @ Detroit
| 
| Tim Duncan (29)
| Tim Duncan (10)
| George Hill, Manu Ginóbili (5)
| Palace of Auburn Hills20,153
| 31–23
|- bgcolor="#bbffbb"
| 55
| February 24
| Oklahoma City
| 
| Manu Ginóbili (26)
| Tim Duncan (15)
| Tim Duncan (6)
| AT&T Center18,400
| 32–23
|- bgcolor="#ffcccc"
| 56
| February 26
| @ Houston
| 
| George Hill (26)
| Manu Ginóbili (10)
| Roger Mason, Jr., Manu Ginóbili (4)
| Toyota Center18,195
| 32–24
|- bgcolor="#bbffbb"
| 57
| February 28
| Phoenix
| 
| Manu Ginóbili, Tim Duncan (21)
| Tim Duncan (10)
| Manu Ginóbili (8)
| AT&T Center18,581
| 33–24

|- bgcolor="#bbffbb"
| 58
| March 1
| @ New Orleans
| 
| George Hill (23)
| Tim Duncan (9)
| Manu Ginóbili (8)
| New Orleans Arena13,655
| 34–24
|- bgcolor="#bbffbb"
| 59
| March 5
| New Orleans
| 
| Tony Parker (20)
| DeJuan Blair (12)
| Tony Parker (6)
| AT&T Center18,581
| 35–24
|- bgcolor="#bbffbb"
| 60
| March 6
| @ Memphis
| 
| Richard Jefferson (18)
| Richard Jefferson (6)
| Manu Ginóbili (6)
| FedEx Forum15,928
| 36–24
|- bgcolor="#ffcccc"
| 61
| March 8
| @ Cleveland
| 
| Manu Ginóbili (38)
| Richard Jefferson (9)
| Manu Ginóbili, Tim Duncan (5)
| Quicken Loans Arena20,562
| 36–25
|- bgcolor="#bbffbb"
| 62
| March 10
| New York
| 
| Manu Ginóbili (28)
| Antonio McDyess (12)
| Manu Ginóbili (5)
| AT&T Center18,278
| 37–25
|- bgcolor="#bbffbb"
| 63
| March 12
| @ Minnesota
| 
| Richard Jefferson, George Hill (19)
| Richard Jefferson (9)
| George Hill (8)
| Target Center17,009
| 38–25
|- bgcolor="#bbffbb"
| 64
| March 13
| L.A Clippers
| 
| Matt Bonner (21)
| Richard Jefferson (9)
| George Hill (11)
| AT&T Center18,581
| 39-25
|- bgcolor="#bbffbb"
| 65
| March 16
| @ Miami
| 
| Manu Ginóbili (22)
| Tim Duncan (11)
| George Hill, Antonio McDyess (4)
| American Airlines Arena18,925
| 40–25
|- bgcolor="#ffcccc"
| 66
| March 17
| @ Orlando
| 
| Richard Jefferson (20)
| Antonio McDyess (7)
| George Hill (4)
| Amway Arena17,461
| 40–26
|- bgcolor="#bbffbb"
| 67
| March 19
| Golden State
| 
| Manu Ginóbili (23)
| DeJuan Blair (9)
| Manu Ginóbili (11)
| AT&T Center18,581
| 41–26
|- bgcolor="#ffcccc"
| 68
| March 21
| @ Atlanta
|  (OT)
| Manu Ginóbili (38)
| Tim Duncan (13)
| Manu Ginóbili (6)
| Philips Arena18,729
| 41–27
|- bgcolor="#bbffbb"
| 69
| March 22
| @ Oklahoma City
| 
| George Hill (27)
| Tim Duncan, Antonio McDyess (7)
| Tim Duncan, Manu Ginóbili (5)
| Ford Center18,203
| 42–27
|- bgcolor="#ffcccc"
| 70
| March 24
| L.A Lakers
| 
| Manu Ginóbili (24)
| Tim Duncan (12)
| Tim Duncan (6)
| AT&T Center18,581
| 42–28
|- bgcolor="#bbffbb"
| 71
| March 26
| Cleveland
| 
| Manu Ginóbili (30)
| George Hill (9)
| George Hill, Manu Ginóbili (6)
| AT&T Center18,581
| 43–28
|- bgcolor="#bbffbb"
| 72
| March 28
| @ Boston
| 
| Manu Ginóbili (28)
| Richard Jefferson, DeJuan Blair (11)
| Manu Ginóbili (7)
| TD Garden18,624
| 44–28
|- bgcolor="#ffcccc"
| 73
| March 29
| @ New Jersey
| 
| George Hill (19)
| Tim Duncan (12)
| Richard Jefferson (5)
| IZOD Center13,053
| 44–29
|- bgcolor="#bbffbb"
| 74
| March 31
| Houston
| 
| George Hill (30)
| Tim Duncan (10)
| Manu Ginóbili (10)
| AT&T Center18,581
| 45–29

|- bgcolor="#bbffbb"
| 75
| April 2
| Orlando
| 
| Manu Ginóbili (43)
| Tim Duncan (8)
| George Hill (9)
| AT&T Center18,581
| 46–29
|- bgcolor="#bbffbb"
| 76
| April 4
| @ L.A Lakers
| 
| Manu Ginóbili (32)
| Tim Duncan (11)
| Manu Ginóbili (5)
| Staples Center18,997
| 47–29
|- bgcolor="#bbffbb"
| 77
| April 6
| @ Sacramento
| 
| Richard Jefferson (18)
| Antonio McDyess (11)
| Manu Ginóbili (6)
| ARCO Arena17,312
| 48–29
|- bgcolor="#ffcccc"
| 78
| April 7
| @ Phoenix
| 
| Roger Mason, Jr. (18)
| DeJuan Blair (8)
| Tony Parker (5)
| US Airways Center18,422
| 48–30
|- bgcolor="#ffcccc"
| 79
| April 9
| Memphis
| 
| Manu Ginóbili (26)
| Tim Duncan (10)
| Tony Parker (8)
| AT&T Center18,581
| 48–31
|- bgcolor="#bbffbb"
| 80
| April 10
| @ Denver
| 
| Tim Duncan (18)
| Tim Duncan (10)
| Manu Ginóbili (7)
| Pepsi Center19,155
| 49–31
|- bgcolor="#bbffbb"
| 81
| April 12
| Minnesota
| 
| Keith Bogans (17)
| Ian Mahinmi (7)
| Tony Parker (7)
| AT&T Center18,581
| 50–31
|- bgcolor="#ffcccc"
| 82
| April 14
| @ Dallas
| 
| DeJuan Blair (27)
| DeJuan Blair (23)
| Roger Mason, Jr. (6)
| American Airlines Center20,405
| 50–32

Playoffs

Game log

|- bgcolor="#ffcccc"
| 1
| April 18
| @ Dallas
| 
| Tim Duncan (27)
| Duncan, McDyess (8) 
| Manu Ginóbili (6) 
| American Airlines Center20,372
| 0–1
|- bgcolor="#bbffbb"
| 2
| April 21
| @ Dallas
| 
| Tim Duncan (25)
| Tim Duncan (17)
| Tony Parker (8)
| American Airlines Center20,728
| 1–1
|- bgcolor="#bbffbb"
| 3
| April 23
| Dallas
| 
| Tim Duncan (25)
| Antonio McDyess (6)
| Manu Ginóbili (7)
| AT&T Center18,581
| 2–1
|- bgcolor="#bbffbb"
| 4
| April 25
| Dallas
| 
| George Hill (29)
| Tim Duncan (11)
| Manu Ginóbili (7)
| AT&T Center18,581
| 3–1
|- bgcolor="#ffcccc"
| 5
| April 27
| @ Dallas
| 
| Tony Parker (18)
| DeJuan Blair (8)
| Tony Parker (6)
| American Airlines Center20,557
| 3–2
|- bgcolor="#bbffbb"
| 6
| April 29
| Dallas
| 
| Manu Ginóbili (26)
| Tim Duncan (10)
| Tony Parker (8)
| AT&T Center18,581
| 4–2

|- bgcolor="#ffcccc"
| 1
| May 3
| @ Phoenix
| 
| Manu Ginóbili (27)
| Tim Duncan (11) 
| Manu Ginóbili (5) 
| US Airways Center18,422
| 0–1
|- bgcolor="#ffcccc"
| 2
| May 5
| @ Phoenix
| 
| Tim Duncan (29)
| Jefferson, Duncan (10)
| Manu Ginóbili (11)
| US Airways Center18,422
| 0–2
|- bgcolor="#ffcccc"
| 3
| May 7
| Phoenix
| 
| Manu Ginóbili (27)
| Tim Duncan (13)
| Ginóbili, Parker (5)
| AT&T Center18,581
| 0–3
|- bgcolor="#ffcccc"
| 4
| May 9
| Phoenix
| 
| Tony Parker (22)
| Duncan, Jefferson (8)
| Manu Ginóbili (9)
| AT&T Center18,581
| 0–4

Player statistics

Season

1Stats with the Spurs.

Playoffs

Awards, records and milestones

Awards

Week/Month

Tim Duncan was named Western Conference Player of the Week for games played from November 23 through November 29.
Manu Ginóbili was named Western Conference Player of the Week for games played from March 22 through March 28.

All-Star

 Tim Duncan was voted as an NBA Western Conference All-Star starter. (12th appearance)

Season

 Tim Duncan was named to the All-NBA Third Team.
 Tim Duncan was named to the NBA All-Defensive Second Team.
 DeJuan Blair was named to the NBA All-Rookie Second Team.

Records

Milestones

Injuries and surgeries

Transactions

Trades

Free agents

Additions

Subtractions

References

External links
2009–10 San Antonio Spurs season at Basketball Reference
2009–10 San Antonio Spurs season at ESPN

San Antonio Spurs
San Antonio Spurs seasons
San Antonio
San Antonio